Sökkmímir or Søkkmímir was a  who appears in two sources from Norse mythology, suggesting that he was once a well-known  in Scandinavia.

In Grímnismál, stanza 50, it appears that Odin killed the :

Notes

Jötnar